Bakovići may refer to:
 Bakovići (Fojnica), Bosnia and Herzegovina
 Bakovići, Kolašin, Montenegro